Edward Bosqui (1832–1917) was a Canadian artist, printer, and pioneer in San Francisco, California. Involved in the Bohemian Club, he was a patron of the arts.

Bosqui was born in Montreal and came to California in 1850. He founded the Bosqui Engraving and Printing Company in 1863. A stereoscopic albumen silver print of the building was taken by Eadweard J. Muybridge in 1869. Bosqui helped organize the San Francisco Art Association in 1871.

His home burned down in 1897 and many of his paintings were destroyed in the fire. His printing business also later burned. 
He had eight children. 
His son, Edward L. Bosqui, became California Fish and Game commissioner. Bosqui died in 1917.

References

1832 births
Date of birth missing
Artists from Montreal
1917 deaths
Date of death missing
Place of death missing
Pre-Confederation Canadian emigrants to the United States
Artists from San Francisco
American company founders
Artists of the American West
19th-century American businesspeople